Churches of Christ is a grouping of the Christian denomination Christian Church (Disciples of Christ) in Nigeria. It dates from 1947. The Fellowship of Churches of Christ in Nigeria is something different.

States with presence of Churches of Christ  (incomplete)
Abuja
Akwa Ibom State
Anambra State
Cross River State
Delta State
Imo State
Kaduna State
Lagos State
Ogun State
Ondo State
Oyo State
Plateau State
Rivers State
Sokoto State

References

See also 
Christianity in Nigeria

Christian denominations in Nigeria
Restoration Movement denominations